Paolo Genovese (born 20 August 1966) is an Italian director and screenwriter.

Life and career 
Born in Rome, after graduating in Economics and Business Genovese started his career at McCann Erickson, directing over one hundred commercials and winning several awards. In 1998 he started collaborating with Luca Miniero co-writing and co-directing the short film La scoperta di Walter; the duo made their feature film debut in 2002, with the critically acclaimed comedy film A Neapolitan Spell.

Genovese made his solo-directing debut in 2010, directing The Santa Claus Gang. In 2016, his film Perfect Strangers won the Award for Best Screenplay in an International Narrative Feature Film at the Tribeca Film Festival and was awarded best film at the David di Donatello Awards.

On November 9, 2019, it was announced that Hollywood Gang, Leone Film Group and Lotus Productions will co-produce the Genovese's The First Day Of My Life from a screenplay by Kirk Jones, Marco Belardi, Andrea Leone and Raffaella Leone. Principal photography began on January 18, 2021 and was scheduled to conclude on March 19, 2021 in Rome, Italy.

Filmography
A Neapolitan Spell (2002, co-directed with Luca Miniero)
Sorry, You Can't Get Through! (2005, co-directed with Luca Miniero)
This Night Is Still Ours (2008, co-directed with Luca Miniero)
The Santa Claus Gang (2010)
The Immature (2011)
The Immature: The Trip (2012)
A Perfect Family (2012) 
Tutta colpa di Freud (2014)
Ever Been to the Moon? (2015)
Perfect Strangers (2016)
The Place (2017)
Superheroes (2021)
The First Day of My Life (TBA)

References

External links 
 

1966 births
Living people
Italian film directors
Italian screenwriters
Italian male screenwriters
Film people from Rome